Glenorchy Rugby Union Football Club is a Rugby Union club in Tasmania. Established in 1935,  the club is a member of the Tasmanian Rugby Union, affiliated with the Australian Rugby Union and plays in the Tasmanian Statewide League.
 
The club's home ground is at Eady Street in the Glenorchy, Tasmania. Known as The Stags, the club colours are black and white. The club currently fields teams in Men's First Division and Juniors competitions

Premierships

Senior Team
Statewide Premiers First Grade 1939, 1991, 1992,1993,1994,1995,1996,2001,2002,2003,2008,2011
Statewide Premiers Reserve Grade
2018

Women's Team
Statewide Premiers First Grade 2008

Juniors
Under 18 Premiers 2008
Under 14 Premiers 2005

References

External links
Australian Rugby Union
Tasmanian Rugby Union
Glenorchy RUFC

Rugby union teams in Tasmania
Rugby clubs established in 1935
1935 establishments in Australia
Women's rugby union teams in Australia
Sport in Hobart
Glenorchy, Tasmania